Aziz Osman Bakir served as the General Secretary of the Arab Scout Bureau.

In 1971, he was awarded the 58th Bronze Wolf, the only distinction of the World Organization of the Scout Movement, awarded by the World Scout Committee for exceptional services to world Scouting.

References

Recipients of the Bronze Wolf Award
Year of birth missing
Scouting and Guiding in Egypt